Kani Konté (born 13 April 1989) is a French-born Malian footballer who plays as a defender for VGA Saint-Maur and the Mali women's national team.

Club career
Konté has played for VGA Saint-Maur and FF Issy in France.

International career
Konté competed for Mali at the 2018 Africa Women Cup of Nations, playing in two matches.

References

1989 births
Living people
People from Choisy-le-Roi
Black French sportspeople
French sportspeople of Malian descent
Citizens of Mali through descent
Footballers from Val-de-Marne
Malian women's footballers
Women's association football defenders
Mali women's international footballers
French women's footballers
GPSO 92 Issy players
Division 1 Féminine players